The Northern Fleet (Severnyy flot) is the fleet of the Russian Navy in the Arctic.

According to the Russian ministry of defence: "The Northern Fleet dates its history back to a squadron created in 1733 to protect the territories of the Russian Empire, sea trade routes and fisheries in the White Sea near the coast of the Kola Peninsula. The order of the Commander-in-Chief of the Russian Navy of 25 May 2014 determined 1733 as the year of foundation of the Northern Fleet, and June 1 as its annual holiday".

In its modern iteration, the Arctic Ocean Flotilla of the former Imperial Navy evolved into a full fleet of the Soviet Navy in 1933 as the Northern Flotilla. After being awarded the Order of the Red Banner in 1965, it was officially known as the Red Banner Northern Fleet. During the Soviet era the Northern Fleet operated more than 200 submarines, ranging from diesel-electric to nuclear-powered ballistic missile classes.

On 1 December 2014 the fleet became the core element of the newly established Northern Fleet Joint Strategic Command, including all Russian armed forces located in Murmansk and Arkhangelsk Oblasts and on Russia's offshore islands along its Arctic coast. It is co-equal in status with Russia's Military Districts. The Northern Fleet is tasked with responsibility for operations and defense in the Arctic seas along Northern Russia, including the Barents Sea and Kara Sea, as well as the northwestern maritime approaches to Russia including the Norwegian Sea and Atlantic Ocean.

The Northern Fleet's headquarters and main base are located in Severomorsk, Murmansk Oblast, with secondary bases elsewhere in the greater Kola Bay area. The current commander is Admiral Aleksandr Moiseyev, who has held the position since May 2019. In June 2020, Russian President Vladimir Putin signed an executive order making the Northern Fleet an independent military-administrative entity, effective January 1, 2021.

History

Arctic Sea Flotilla and White Sea Flotilla
On June 19, 1916, the Imperial Russian Navy formed the Arctic Ocean Flotilla (Флотилия Северного Ледовитого океана, or Flotiliya Severnogo Ledovitogo okeana) during World War I to safeguard transportation routes of Allied ships through the Barents Sea from the Kaiserliche Marine of the German Empire. After the October Revolution and the collapse of the Russian Empire in 1917, the Soviet Navy replaced the Imperial Russian Navy and formed the White Sea Flotilla (Беломорская флотилия, Belomorskaya flotiliya) in March 1920, based in Arkhangelsk. The White Sea Flotilla replaced the Arctic Sea Flotilla and was renamed as the Naval Forces of the North Sea, but was later disbanded in January 1923.

Soviet Navy

Northern Flotilla
The Northern Flotilla was formed on August 5, 1933, by transferring patrol boats Smerch and Uragan, D-class submarines Dekabrist (D-1) and Narodovolyets (D-2) and two destroyers from the Baltic Fleet to Northern Russia. These ships departed from Kronstadt on 18 May 1933 and arrived at Murmansk on 5 August. Another destroyer, another patrol boat, another submarine, and two minesweepers joined the flotilla at Soroka in September 1933. Polyarny became the flotilla's main base, and a flight of MBR-2 flying boats joined the unit at Murmansk in September 1935.

The Northern Flotilla was quickly expanded in the years after it was formed, receiving new ships, airfields, coastal and air defence artillery. On May 11, 1937, the fleet entered its current form when it was renamed to the Northern Fleet (Северный флот, Severnyy flot).

World War II
The Northern Fleet blocked the Finnish military base at Petsamo through the Winter War of 1939 and 1940. By June 1941, the fleet included 8 destroyers, 15 submarines, 2 torpedo boats, 7 patrol boats, 2 minesweepers, and 116 airplanes.

In August 1940, the Soviets created the White Sea Military Base to defend the coastline, bases, ports, and other installations. The White Sea Flotilla was established in August 1941 under the command of Rear-Admiral M. Dolinin. Subsequent commanders were Vice Admiral Georgy Stepanov (in October), Rear-Admiral Stepan Kucherov, and Vice-Admiral Yuriy Panteleyev.

During the German-Soviet War of 1941 to 1945, the Northern Fleet defended the coastlines of the Rybachy and Sredny peninsulas, secured internal and external transportation routes, and provided support to the maritime flank of the 14th Army. Naval Infantry and up to 10,000 Northern Fleet personnel participated in land warfare including the Petsamo-Kirkenes Operation of 1944. Northern Fleet Naval Infantry units caused tens of thousands of German casualties fighting during the Moscow, Leningrad, Stalingrad, and North Caucasus campaigns.

Among the air units of the Northern Fleet was the 121st Fighter Aviation Regiment. The Northern Fleet was reinforced with naval aircraft and ships from the Pacific Ocean and Caspian Sea. During the war, the Northern Fleet secured safe passage for 1,463 ships in external convoys and 2,568 ships in internal convoys.

Its submarines, torpedo boats, and aviation sank 192 enemy transport ships and 70 other hostile military ships. The Northern Fleet also damaged a total of 118 transport, military, and auxiliary ships. Soviet submarine K-21, under the command of Captain Nikolai Lunin, attacked the German battleship Tirpitz at 71° 22' 2"N, 24° 34' 3"E. The К-21 logbook reports observation of two torpedo explosions, but no damage is reported by German sources.

Ships were lost fighting against unequal odds. Patrol boat Tuman, a former trawler, was sunk by three Kriegsmarine destroyers at the entrance to Kola Bay on August 4, 1941. The icebreaker Sibiryakov was sunk on August 25, 1942 by the German pocket battleship Admiral Scheer while defending two convoys. The patrol ship Brilliant (formerly trawler Murmany) was sunk by a submarine.

The Northern Fleet received the following awards:

 Two airborne regiments, a squadron of submarine hunters, eight submarines, and the destroyer Гремящий (Gremyaschiy, or "Rattler") were awarded "Soviet Guards" status.
 Many formations, units, and ships were awarded with Order honors.
 Eighty-five sailors of the Northern Fleet received the title of the Hero of the Soviet Union (with three of them receiving the award twice).
 More than a total of 48,000 men were awarded medals.

Cold War
The White Sea Flotilla was reestablished under the fleet in December 1945 and the White Sea Naval Base in December 1956.

The Northern Fleet was considered secondary to the Baltic and Black sea fleets until operational responsibility for the Atlantic Ocean was shifted in the 1950s because of more direct access.  In September 1955, the Soviet navy became the first to launch a ballistic missile from a submarine.  In June 1956, Northern Fleet , (NATO designation Zulu IV 1/2) “Б-67” (B-67) became the first to carry  ballistic missiles.

The 2nd Cruiser Division was formed on 31 May 1956 at Severomorsk, Murmansk Oblast. On 5 June 1969, the division was reorganised with the 170th Destroyer Brigade (8 Project 56 destroyers) and the 10th Anti-Submarine Warfare Brigade (10 Project 42 and 50 ASW vessels). On 1 April 1961, the division was renamed the 2nd Anti-Submarine Warfare Division.

On 1 July 1958, the Northern Fleet raised the Soviet Navy ensign over the first Soviet nuclear submarine, K-3 Leninskiy Komsomol.  Following the 1958 voyage of USS Nautilus, the Leninskiy Komsomol (named for Vladimir Lenin's Komsomol) traveled under the Arctic ice and surfaced at the North Pole on 17 July 1962.  Russian submarines have visited the North Pole region more than 300 times since then.  Two nuclear submarines of the Northern Fleet made a journey under the Arctic ice cap and reached the Pacific Fleet for the first time in history in September 1963.

More than 25 Soviet submarines did the same in the following years.  The Northern Fleet was awarded the Order of the Red Banner on 7 May 1965.  Two Northern Fleet submarines made a  journey "around the world"  (actually only between the Kola Gulf and the base at Petropavlovsk-Kamchatskiy around South America) without surfacing in 1966.  The Northern Fleet had almost 50% of the Soviet Navy's submarines by 1986.

The Museum of the Air Forces of the Northern Fleet was opened on 20 August 1976, in the closed settlement of Safonovo, Murmansk Oblast. Aircraft carriers began entering service with the Fleet in the 1970s. Fortification of the southern reaches of the Barents Sea during the 1980s marked a Soviet naval strategy shift to an emphasis on bastion defense. Russia has continued to employ that strategy.

In 1982, the 175th independent Naval Infantry Brigade was formed at Tumannyy, in Murmansk Oblast.

Russian Navy

An analysis of the Northern Fleet produced by Chatham House in the UK notes that: "After the fall of the Soviet Union, the Kremlin paid little attention to the Arctic. During the 1990s, the Russian Arctic was at best considered a burden fraught with socio-economic problems. Little was done there until an ‘Arctic revival’ began in the 2000s, focused on reinvesting in a region that had previously been abandoned for more than 15 years".

Units were disbanded in the 1990s including the 6th and 3rd Submarine divisions in addition to aviation units. Previous units also included the 1st Submarine Flotilla, and the 7th Submarine Division of nuclear attack submarines. In 1989 the Soviet Navy had nearly 200 nuclear submarines in operation of which two-thirds were said to belong to the Northern Fleet. By 1996, only half were still in service.

The 57th Naval Missile Aviation Division of Tu-22s and electronic warfare Tu-16s from the Baltic Fleet at Bykhov, Mogilev Oblast, in the Belorussian SSR transferred to the Northern Fleet in December 1991 as the 57th Combined Ship Aviation Division. The division commanded the 830th and 38th Shipborne Anti-Submarine Helicopter Regiments and the 279th Shipborne Fighter Aviation Regiment from Severomorsk-3 in Murmansk Oblast until disbanded on 1 May 1998.

The 5th Naval Missile Aviation Division commanding the 524th and 574th Naval Missile Aviation Regiments.  The 574th Regiment was based at Lakhta air base (Katunino), until disbanded in 2002. The 100th Independent Shipborne Fighter Aviation Regiment (in February 1993) and its personnel and equipment absorbed by the 279th Shipborne Fighter Aviation Regiment.

On 12 August 2000, the Kursk submarine disaster gained international attention when the  Kursk of the Northern Fleet perished in a torpedo accident during exercises in the Barents Sea near Murmansk Oblast, resulting in the deaths of 118 sailors.

Beginning in the early 2000s, however, a renewed emphasis was placed on modernizing the Russian Navy, including the Northern Fleet. As argued in the Chatham House analysis: "Moscow's intentions for the Arctic are not Arctic-specific, but are related to the Kremlin's global ambitions for reviving Russia as a great power. Russia's force posture in the Arctic is informed by the changing geopolitical environment around its strained relations with the West".

The importance attached to the Northern Fleet is illustrated by the fact that it constitutes its own district command within the Russian Armed Forces equal to the Armed Forces' other military districts. In January 2016, Defence Minister Sergey Shoygu announced that the 45th Air Force and Air Defence Army had been formed under control of the Northern Fleet in December 2015. Its territorial control center assumed combat duty in July 2018. Today both the 45th Air Force and Air Defence Army, as well as the 14th Army Corps, fall under the Northern Fleet Joint Strategic Command, which was established in 2014 and is a military-administered district of equal status to the other four military districts of the Russian Armed Forces. Its jurisdiction is primarily within the northern region of European Russia and the Arctic Ocean. The formal status of the Northern Fleet as a command equal to that of other Russian military districts took effect on January 1, 2021.

The Northern Fleet includes about two-thirds of all the Russian Navy's nuclear-powered ships.  The flagship   Pyotr Velikiy is named after Peter the Great.  The Fleet staged a series of major Barents Sea exercises in January 2004 involving thirteen ships and seven submarines including Pyotr Velikiy, Admiral Kuznetsov, with President Vladimir Putin was aboard the Typhoon class ballistic missile submarine Arkhangelsk.  The exercise was marred by two RSM-54 SLBM launch failures aboard Novomoskovsk and Kareliya.

Submarines have traditionally been the strongest component of the Northern Fleet. Several new classes of submarines are in production to replace older models including: Borei/Dolgorukiy-class SSBNs, Yasen-class SSGNs, Khabarovsk-class SSGNs and Lada-class conventionally-powered submarines. However, the existing nuclear-powered submarines of the Northern Fleet are also aging rapidly. It is currently unclear whether the new Yasen-class, and other potential follow-on models, can be produced in sufficient numbers, and on a timely basis, to replace aging older nuclear submarines on a one-for-one basis. In this regard, reports suggest that Russian third-generation nuclear submarines have not been modernized to a level to avoid block obsolescence before 2030.

The Northern Fleet has also received attention with respect to technological upgrades. The Fleet has received new combat aircraft (deployed within the 45th Air and Air Defence Army), enhanced shore-based missile assets (both surface-to-surface and surface-to-air) as well as new systems such as the Samarkand electronic warfare systems in 2017 and the Barnaul-T air reconnaissance system in December 2021. Samarkand is designed to assess electromagnetic situation, search, detect and analyze radio emissions and Barnaul-T helps conduct reconnaissance round-the-clock. Russia's Northern Fleet in 2018 resumed regular air patrols of the Arctic by long-range anti-submarine aircraft and its share of modern samples of weapons and equipment exceeded 56 percent. An air defense regiment of the Northern fleet armed with S-400 SAM launchers went on combat duty in Novaya Zemlya in the September 2019.

Ground force modernization has also been a priority focus through the creation of the 14th Army Corps within the fleet and broader equipment modernization. A tank battalion of a Northern Fleet's separate motorized infantry brigade received the final batch of 26 T-80BVM tanks and completed the rearmament procedure in November 2019. The 76th Guards Air Assault Division and the 98th Guards Airborne Division, strategic reserve formations from the Russian Airborne Forces, might be deployed to help protect the Kola Peninsula, in certain circumstances.

While the Northern Fleet has traditionally emphasized the deployment of larger warships and submarines, new missile boats (of the Buyan/M and Karakurt classes) have temporarily been able to deploy into Northern Fleet waters utilizing Russian internal waterways. In 2020, the Buyan-M class corvette Zelenyy Dol and the Karakurt-class corvette Odintsovo trained and conducted trials in Arctic waters having deployed to northern waters via the internal waterways. The deployment illustrated the Russian capacity to reinforce the Northern Fleet with cruise missile-armed light units, potentially drawn from the Russian Navy's two other western fleets or from the Caspian Flotilla. In 2021, the Karakurt-class corvette Sovetsk also made the transit from the Baltic to the White Sea for missile exercises.

In late 2021 it was reported that the Russian Navy was considering the possible creation of a new fleet, termed the Arctic Fleet, which would be oriented to employing "ships and special equipment suitable for the Arctic". The Northern and Pacific fleets would continue to focus on "combat missions". If established, it was envisaged that the Arctic Fleet would maintain infrastructure separate from the Northern and Pacific fleets.

Sites

The Northern Fleet's main base is Severomorsk. There are six more naval bases at Polyarnyy, Olenya Bay, Gadzhiyevo (Yagelnaya/Sayda), Vidyayevo (Ura Bay and Ara Bay), Bolshaya Lopatka (Litsa Guba), and  Gremikha.  Civilian Arktika nuclear-powered icebreakers are based at Murmansk.  Shipyards are located in Murmansk, Severodvinsk, Roslyakovo, Polyarnyy, Nerpa, and Malaya Lopatka.  Spent fuel storage sites include Murmansk, Gremikha, Severodvinsk and Andreyeva Bay.

HQ Band

The Military Band of the Northern Fleet is a military band unit of the Russian Armed Forces that is a branch of the Military Band Service of the Armed Forces of Russia. It is based at the fleet HQ in Severomorsk. The band also takes part in national events and holidays in Russia such as the Victory Day and Defender of the Fatherland Day holidays as well as the Navy Day fleet parade. It has taken part in the ceremonial arrival of ships to the Northern Fleet Headquarters including the Vice-Admiral Kulakov and the USS Nicholas.

It had taken part in the funerals of many of the victims of the Kursk submarine disaster in the fall of 2000. In mid-March 2018, it took part in a competition at the Murmansk Nakhimov Naval School, which was presided by Colonel Timofey Mayakin, the Senior Director of Music of the Russian Armed Forces. In September of that year, the band as well as a band from Tromsø, Norway, where they performed "Norwegian March" and "Farewell of Slavianka" at the Murmansk Regional Philharmonic.

Order of battle
From January 1, 2021 the Northern Fleet command was made a separate command within the Russian Armed Forces having equal status to the other Russian military districts. As such, it consists of naval forces (the Northern Fleet itself), land forces (14th Army Corps, plus naval infantry and coastal defence troops), as well as aviation and air defence assets (45th Air Force and Air Defence Army).

Additional capability in Arctic waters is provided by civilian icebreakers operated by the state-owned Rosatom company as well as other companies (Rosmorport, Gazprom Neft) and a Project 21180 vessel built for the Russian Navy. This icebreaker fleet, which includes seven nuclear-powered vessels operated by Rosatom, has been described as "crucial to military access and operations". Additional nuclear-powered Project 22220 (three in service, two more building and two additional ships planned as of early 2023) and Project 10510 (one vessel building) icebreakers have entered service, or are under construction/planned, to augment and replace those in service.

The Navy, in turn, is procuring a new "lightened" class of Project 21180M icebreakers (which are two-thirds the displacement of the existing Project 21180 ship) with the first vessel being deployed with the Pacific Fleet in early 2023. These plans were formalized under the terms of a presidential executive order and Arctic strategy unveiled in October 2020. The icebreakers are designed to ensure the capacity of year-round navigation along the Northern Sea Route.

The Russian Coast Guard provides additional armed patrol vessels in Arctic waters with a further expansion of its capabilities anticipated in the 2020s.

As of early 2023, the Northern Fleet itself comprises about 32 surface warships (including major surface combatants, light corvettes, mine counter-measures vessels and amphibious units), though some units are under repair or otherwise not operational. Additional lighter patrol units, support ships and auxiliaries are also deployed. The Fleet also comprises around 34+ submarines (including ballistic missile submarines, cruise missile submarines, special purpose submarines as well as nuclear and conventional attack submarines). As with the surface fleet, some submarines are not operational; others are in reserve and inactive. Nevertheless, programs to modernize the Russian Navy are continuing with the Northern Fleet traditionally having a priority focus with respect to major combatants.

Submarines
 11th Squadron, Zaozersk
 Oscar II-class SSGNs:
Orel (K-266) (active as of 2021)
 Smolensk (K-410) (active as of 2022)
 Voronezh (K-119) (reported in reserve; may be in process of decommissioning)
 Yasen-class SSGNs:
 Severodvinsk (K-560) (active; reported deployed to the Mediterranean as of October 2022)
 Kazan (K-561) (active)
 7th Division, Vidyaevo 
 Sierra II-class SSNs:
 Nizhniy Novgorod (B-534) (active as of 2019)
 Pskov (K-336) (active as of 2019)
 Victor-III-class SSNs:
 Obninsk (K-138) (active as of 2017)
 Tambov (K-448) (reported on sea trials in early 2023 after seven-year refit)
 12th Squadron, Gadzhiyevo
 31st Submarine Division (Yagelnaya Bay, Sayda Inlet) 
 Delta IV-class SSBNs: (Delta IVs reported to be incrementally withdrawn from service through the 2020s)
 Karelia (K-18) (active as of 2022)
 Verkhoturye (K-51) (active as of 2021)
 Tula (K-114) (active as of 2022; refit completed 2017) 
 Bryansk (K-117) (reported in refit as of 2022)
 Novomoskovsk (K-407)
 Borei-class SSBNs:
 Yury Dolgorukiy (K-535) (active)
 Knyaz Vladimir (K-549) (active as of 2021)
 24th Submarine Division (Russia) (Yagelnaya Bay, Sayda Inlet), traditionally operating Akula-class SSNs:
 Pantera (K-317) (in reserve)
 Gepard (K-335) (active as of 2021)
 Tigr (K-154) (in refit until 2023; to be equipped with 3M-54 Kalibr cruise missiles)
 Volk (K-461) (inactive; reported in 2020 as scheduled for "medium-overhaul" refit and arming with Kalibr cruise missiles) 
 Vepr (K-157) (active as of 2022; returned to the fleet in 2020 post-refit)
 Leopard (K-328) (laid up since 2011 but medium-overhaul refit progressing as of 2020; being armed with 3M-54 Kalibr cruise missiles; projected as likely to begin post-refit sea trials in 2022)
 4th Submarine Flotilla (Polyarny (ru))  
 161st Submarine Division:
 Kilo-class (diesel/electric) submarines (SSK):
 Kaluga (B-800) (active as of 2022)
 Vladikavkaz (B-459)
 Magnitogorsk (B-471)
 Lipetsk (B-177)
Lada-class conventional propulsion (diesel/electric) submarines: 
Sankt Peterburg (B-585) (active; prototype of the class and reportedly used as "test platform" up to 2021; formally "accepted into service" in 2021)
 Kronshtadt (B-586) (Sea trials in the Baltic as of December 2021)
 29th Special Submarine Squadron  (Special operations submarines deployed with the Northern Fleet but under the command of the Main Directorate of Deep-Sea Research):
 BS-64 Podmoskovye (active as of 2021; ex-Delta IV-class SSBN with missile tubes removed in "special purpose" role; "mothership" for smaller special operations submarine Losharik)
 Belgorod (K-329) (Entered service July 2022; reported in 2022 as expected initially to operate in an "experimental role" with the Northern Fleet and then as likely to transfer to the Pacific Fleet; likely to also act as mothership for mini-submarines)
 Sarov (B-90) (active; hybrid conventional/nuclear-propulsion; intelligence collection/technology demonstrator)
 Losharik (AS-12/or 28/or 31) (hybrid conventional/nuclear propulsion; incapacitated after major fire July 2019; major repair work underway as of 2021 but may not return to service until 2024 or 2025; intelligence/special operations role)
 Orenburg (BS-136) (active; ex-Delta III-class SSBN; experimental role)
 Paltus-class submarine (special purpose mini-submarines; hybrid conventional/nuclear propulsion):
 AS-21
 AS-35
 Project 1910 Kashalot-class (nuclear-powered special operations submarine)
 AS-13
 AS-15

Surface warships
 43rd Missile Ship Division
 Kuznetsov-class aircraft carrier (CV) Admiral Flota Sovetskogo Soyuza Kuznetsov (063), Navy flagship. (Severely damaged by fire, December 2019. Not likely to return to active operations until 2023 or perhaps 2024.)
 s (CGN): 
 Pyotr Velikiy (099), Fleet flagship (active as of 2022)
 Admiral Nakhimov (085) (in refit; date of return to service uncertain; may begin sea trials in 2023 but return to service could be as late as 2024 and then replace "Pyotr Velikiy" during her planned refit)
 Slava-class cruiser (CG) Marshal Ustinov (055) (active; deployed in the Mediterranean February to August 2022)
 Sovremennyy-class destroyer (DDG) Admiral Ushakov (returned to service in 2021 post-refit)
 Admiral Gorshkov-class frigates:
 Admiral Gorshkov (on long-term deployment in the Atlantic/Indian Ocean in early 2023).
 Admiral Kasatonov (deployed in the Mediterranean in 2022, returning to Murmansk as of March 2023)
 Admiral Golovko (sea trials in the Baltic)

  2nd Anti-Submarine Ship Division 
 Udaloy-class destroyers (DDG): 
 Vice Admiral Kulakov (deployed in the Mediterranean February to August 2022)
 Severomorsk (active as of 2022)
Admiral Levchenko (active post-refit as of 2022)
 Admiral Chabanenko (inactive; reported in refit as of 2020)

 Small Missile Ships (Light Missile Corvette)
 Nanuchka III-class corvette
 Rassvyet (520) (active as of 2021)

 Small Anti-Submarine Ships (ASW Corvette)
 Grisha III-class corvette
 Brest (199) (active as of 2022)
 Yunga (113) (active as of 2022)
 Onega (164) (active as of 2021)
 Naryan-Mar (138) (active as of 2021)
 Monchegorsk (190)
 Snezhnogorsk (196) (active as of 2022)
 Amphibious Warfare Vessels
 Ivan Gren-class landing ships
 Ivan Gren (0135) (active as of 2022)
 Petr Morgunov (117) (active; deployed to the Black Sea and participating in the invasion of Ukraine)
 Ropucha-class landing ships
 Olenegorskiy Gornyak (012) (active; deployed to the Black Sea and participating in the invasion of Ukraine; refit completed 2019)
 Kondopoga (027) (active as of 2021)
 Georgiy Pobedonosets (016) (active; deployed to the Black Sea and participating in the invasion of Ukraine)
 Aleksandr Otrakovskiy (031) (active as of 2022)
 Project 02510 BK-16E high-speed assault boats: 4 vessels (D-308, D-2110, RVK-703, D-321)
 Mine Countermeasures Ships:
 Sonya-class: 7 vessels (BT-21, Polyarny, Kotelnich, Yadrin, Kolona – latter four all reported active as of 2020 -, Elnya reported active as of 2022, and Solovtskiy yunga reported active as of 2023)
 Gorya-class: 1 vessel (Vladimir Gumanenko – active as of 2022)
 Patrol/Anti-saboteur Boats:
 Grachonok-class anti-saboteur ship: 4 vessels (P-340 Yunarmeets Zapolyarya; P-421 Yunarmeets Belomorya; P-429; P-430 Valery Fedyanin)
 Icebreakers: 
 Project 21180 icebreaker Ilya Muromets (active)
 Project 97 Icebreakers: 2 vessels: Vladimir Kavrayskiy and Ruslan 
 Intelligence Vessels (operated by the Main Directorate of Deep-Sea Research):
 Vishnya-class intelligence ships:
 Kurily
 Viktor Leonov 
 Tavriya
 Balzam-class intelligence ship Pribaltika
 Yury Ivanov-class intelligence ship Yuriy Ivanov (active as of 2021)
 Project 7452-class intelligence ship Chusuvoy
 Project 22010-class intelligence ship Yantar (active as of 2022)
 Project 02670-class 'Oceanographic research vessel' Evgeny Gorigledzhan (sea trials in the Baltic as of 2022)
 Fleet Oilers:
 Boris Chilikin-class: 1 vessel (Sergey Osipov; active as of 2021)
 Dubna class: 1 vessel (Dubna)
 Kaliningrad Neft class: 2 vessels (Vyazma and Kama (former Argun); Vyazma accompanied Marshal Ustinov and Vice Admiral Kulakov on their Mediterranean and Atlantic deployment in 2022; Kama accompanying Admiral Gorshkov in 2023 long-range deployment)
 Akademik Pashin class: 1 vessel (Akademik Pashin; deployed to the Mediterranean as of August 2022)
 Logistic Support Ships: 
 1 Elbrus-class (Project 23120) ice-capable logistics support vessel (entered service 2018)
 Project 304-class Repair Ships: 3 vessels (PM-10, PM-69, PM-75)
 Hydrographic Survey Vessels: 4 Yug-class (Project 862) vessels
 Vizir
 Temryuk (formerly Mangyshlak)
 Gorizont (active as of 2021)
 Senezh

Aviation and Air Defence Forces
 45th Air Force and Air Defence Army 
 40th Mixed Aviation Regiment (previously 924th Long Range Air Reconnaissance Regiment?) – HQ at Olenegorsk/Olenya – Tu-22M3 Backfire bombers with Kh-32 long-range supersonic and Kh-47M2 Kinzhal hypersonic anti-ship missiles; – Deployed in the Northern Fleet/45th Air Army area of operations but under command of Russian Long-Range Aviation Forces
 98th Separate Mixed Aviation Regiment: Two Squadrons: Su-24M; One Squadron: MiG-31 BM-variant in air defence role; some K-variant reported in anti-ship role with Kh-47M2 Kinzhal hypersonic anti-ship missiles (ASM); Su-24 reported converting to Su-34 (“Fullback”) fighters with Kh-35U ASM (Monchegorsk (air base))
 100th Independent Shipborne Fighter Aviation Regiment – Severomorsk-3 air base; Two Squadrons: mix of MiG-29K/KUB, Su-27/KUB and Su-25/UTG aircraft reported (MiG-29K elements reported deployed in interim land-based role at Rogachyovo airfield in 2021)
 279th Shipborne Fighter Aviation Regiment – HQ at Severomorsk-3  – Two Squadrons: Su-33 (Flanker-D)/Su-25UTG (as of 2021)
 174th Guards Fighter Aviation Regiment reported deployed by end of 2019 with MiG-31BM (K-variant in anti-ship role with Kh-47M2 Kinzhal ASM) (Monchegorsk airfield with additional forward operating bases, including Nagurskoye air field on Alexandra Land, Rogachevo air base, Sredniy in Severnaya Zemlya, Kotelny in the New Siberian Islands and Wrangel Island)
 73rd Independent Air Squadron – HQ at Kipelovo (Fedotovo) – Tu-142MK, Tu-142MR Maritime Patrol/ASW aircraft;
 403rd Guards Mixed Aviation Regiment – HQ at Severomorsk-1 –  One ASW/ELINT Squadron: Il-38/N ASW aircraft, Il-22 command aircraft (NATO reporting name: Coot B), and Il-20RT electronic intelligence aircraft; One Transport Squadron: Tu-134, An-12, An-26 transport aircraft (2019)
 830th Independent Shipborne Anti-Submarine Helicopter Regiment – HQ at Severomorsk-1 – Ka-27/PL/M ASW, Ka-29 attack, Ka-31 airborne radar helicopters (2019)
 1st Air Defence Division (Murmansk Oblast)
 531st Anti-Aircraft Missile Regiment (Severomorsk-1 and 3 air base region – S-400/Pantsir-S1 surface-to-air missiles)
 583rd Anti-Aircraft Missile Regiment (Olenya region – S-300PM/PS surface-to-air missile system)
 1528th Anti-Aircraft Missile Regiment (Severodvinsk – S-400 SAMs)
 3rd Air Defence Division (created 2019):
 33rd Anti-Aircraft Missile Regiment (S-400 SAM systems) (Rogachovo air base, Novaya Zemlya, Arkhangelsk Oblast) (as of 2019) 
 414th Anti-Aircraft Missile Regiment established in 2019 with S-300V4 and/or S-300PS? surface-to-air missile system at Tiksi
 S-400 SAM deployments reported in both 1st and 3rd Air Defence Divisions at: Alexandra Land (Nagurskoye air base), Kotelny Island, and Wrangel Island, among others.
 S-300P SAM (NATO reporting name: SA-10 Grumble) at Rogachovo air base and elsewhere.

Northern Fleet Coastal Troops
 14th Army Corps: 
 80th Arctic Motor Rifle Brigade (Alakurtti)(arctic warfare brigade; equipment includes 122-mm 2S1 Gvozdika self-propelled howitzers; re-equipment of both 80th and 200th brigades on BTR-82A APCs was completed in 2016)
 200th Motorized Rifle Brigade (Pechenga): deployed assets include Tor-M2DT mobile SAM system deployed on DT-30PM all-terrain vehicles (as of 2019); (tank battalion reported to have fully re-equipped with T-80BVM MBT in 2020; elements of the Brigade reported deployed on operations in Ukraine as of February 2022 and reserve battalion reported activated for Ukraine as of July 2022)
 Naval Infantry/Special Forces
 61st Naval Infantry Brigade (As of February 2022, elements of the Brigade reported deployed to the Black Sea as part of Russian amphibious task force for operations in Ukraine. In 2023, it is  reported that the brigade had conducted combat training with BTR-80)
 420th Naval Reconnaissance Spetsnaz Point (Special Forces battalion) (Zverosovkhoz)
 Coastal Missile & Artillery Troops: 536th Coastal Missile and Artillery Brigade (coastal missile brigades normally deployed with 3–5 K-300P Bastion-P battalions and 1–2 Bal battalions).
 Bal mobile coastal missile system reported deployed on the Sredny Peninsula and Franz Josef Island (planned to be fitted at strategic locations along the entire Northern Sea Route)
 Bastion coastal defence missile system with P-800 Oniks supersonic anti-ship cruise missiles reported on Alexandra Land in the Franz Josef Islands and Kotelny Island.

Commanders

See also 
 Status 6 (Poseidon)

References 

Attribution:

Further reading

External links

Official site at mil.ru 
Bellona Foundation site about the Russian Northern Fleet
"Прощание Славянки" – Оркестр штаба Северного Флота (2014)
Оркестр Штаба Северного Флота и Виктор Седнев – Бузуки
Оркестр Северного Флота – Норильск 29.08.19

Barents Sea
Military in the Arctic
Military units and formations awarded the Order of the Red Banner
Military units and formations established in 1933
Northern Fleet
Russian fleets
Russian Navy